Disney Institute is the professional development and external training arm of The Walt Disney Company. The company showcases 'the business behind the magic' through seminars, workshops and presentations, as well as programs for professionals from many different industries, including healthcare, aerospace/aviation, government/military, food/beverage and retail.

The Disney Institute was formerly a resort and learning center opened in February 1996 by Michael Eisner. The resort, which was partly based on the Chautauqua Institution in New York, was envisioned as a new direction in vacationing; one that was more about hands-on learning, personal development and interactivity rather than the more passive, entertainment-based experience traditionally offered in Disney's theme parks. The institute's original curriculum was pared down over the years due to lackluster attendance. Its main public campus closed in 2003 to become Disney's Saratoga Springs Resort & Spa. The program including accommodations and some meals started at $3,700. At the time of the resort's closing, Disney Institute instructors compiled their customer service courses into a book titled Be Our Guest, Perfecting the art of customer service.

Disney Institute is different from Disney University, which is the internal "cast member" training division of the company.

History

As a residential community
The site of the original Disney Institution can be traced back to June 1973, when Disney announced plans for a master-planned residential community of Lake Buena Vista. The community was to be divided into four themed areas: Golf, Tennis, Boating and Western. By May 1974, A total of 133 town homes had been built and an adjacent shopping center, the Lake Buena Vista Village, was being constructed. The developer, Lake Buena Vista Communities, was planning to build single family homes, apartments and condos in the near future. In July 1974, a construction contract was awarded for a retirement community, vacation townhouses, and apartments.  The shopping village opened in March 1975 and 60 Treehouse villas were completed that October.

The residences were nicknamed "Villas", and were designed to showcase energy-efficient housing ideas. They were built clustered around courtyards and cul-de-sacs to conserve space and green areas.

As a resort
Because the residents would have the ability to vote on Resort Construction, and due to taxation issues, Disney decided to abandon the residential aspect of the project and focus more on hotel accommodations. In the 1980s, the villas were transformed into a hotel resort, starting with the construction of the "Walt Disney World Conference Center". The resort opened as "The Village Resort" in 1985. The name was changed to "The Disney Village Resort" in 1989. The Lake Buena Vista Village shopping center changed its focus towards Walt Disney World visitors, thus being renamed "Walt Disney World Village", which was later absorbed into the present-day Disney Springs (formerly Downtown Disney) and named The Marketplace.

The villas were divided into several sections:
Vacation Villas: One-and-two bedroom dwellings.
Fairway Villas: Townhomes that overlooked the Lake Buena Vista Golf Course. They featured energy-efficient features, such as their roof overhangs and double glazed windows.
Treehouse Villas: Three-bedroom octagonal villas on top of  pedestals to withstand flooding and allow for natural drainage.
Club Lake Villas: Added in a later building phase and were meant to appeal to conventioneers attending meetings at the Walt Disney World Conference Center.
Grand Vista Suites: Four single-family dwellings originally constructed as model homes for the residential development.

As The Disney Institute Resort
In 1996, the Villas became part of the Disney Institute. The Vacation Villas became known as Townhomes and The Club Lake Villas/Club Suites became known as Bungalows at this time. Early on the Disney Institute hosted 40 different programs with 3-day to a week long stay ranging in price from $429 to $1,310. The Conference Center, as well as other common buildings, were renovated and absorbed into the institute. Institute buildings included 28 program studios, a 225-seat performance center, a 1,150-seat outdoor amphitheater, a 400-seat cinema, a closed-circuit TV station (DITV), a radio station (WALT) and a sports and fitness center with a full service spa. The resort had a restaurant called "Seasons" and featured a themed dinner menu that rotated nightly.

Guests had to choose to participate in an array of over 80 programs. These programs were under categories such as
Animation, Culinary, Gardening, The Great Outdoors, Photography, Television and Youth.

In 2000, Disney changed the focus of the institute from a family-oriented program, to a multi-day seminar for business professionals to learn the "secrets" behind Disney's customer service and business culture. However, this concept did not last, and the resort was closed down in 2003 to make way for the Disney Vacation Club resort, Disney's Saratoga Springs Resort & Spa. Most of the Villas were torn down, except for the Treehouse Villas, which were renovated and reopened. The former Institute program studios and spa building were renovated as the clubhouse of the Saratoga Springs Resort.

References

External links
Disney Institute
Photos of the former Institute Resort
Disney Institute History

Walt Disney World
The Walt Disney Company
1996 establishments in Florida
Michael Eisner